Grover Stewart Sargent (September 8, 1884 – November 28, 1957) was a Canadian amateur ice hockey player, primarily with the Montreal Hockey Club (MAAA) in the Canadian Amateur Hockey League (CAHL) and Eastern Canada Amateur Hockey Association (ECAHA).

Sargent, a centre forward, was active as a senior player from 1903–1916. In January 1908 he participated in a benefit All-Star game, hosted by the Eastern Canada Amateur Hockey Association, for the family of deceased hockey player Hod Stuart, who had died in June 1907 in a diving accident. Montreal Wanderers won the game against the ECAHA All-Stars 10 goals to 7.

He died in 1957, aged 73, and is buried at Lakeview Memorial Gardens in Pointe-Claire, Quebec.

References

Bibliography

Notes

1884 births
1957 deaths
Canadian ice hockey centres
Sportspeople from Quebec
Montreal Hockey Club players
Winnipeg Victorias players